Glodu River may refer to:

 Glodu, a tributary of the Azuga in Prahova County
 Glodu, a tributary of the Ialomicioara in Dâmbovița County
 Glodu, a tributary of the Secu Vaduri in Neamț County
 Glodu, a tributary of the Vasilatu in Vâlcea County

See also 
 Glodu (disambiguation)